Bebearia cinaethon is a butterfly in the family Nymphalidae. It is found in Equatorial Guinea, Gabon, the Republic of the Congo and the Democratic Republic of the Congo.

Subspecies
Bebearia cinaethon cinaethon (Equatorial Guinea, Gabon, Congo, Democratic Republic of the Congo: Mayumbe)
Bebearia cinaethon ikelemboides Hecq, 1989 (Democratic Republic of the Congo: Kinshasa)

References

Butterflies described in 1874
cinaethon
Butterflies of Africa
Taxa named by William Chapman Hewitson